Advanced Technologies Academy (A-TECH/ATA) is a magnet public high school in Las Vegas, Nevada, United States. It focuses on integrating technology with academics for students in grades 9-12. The magnet school program was founded in 1994 and is part of the Clark County School District. The first year included only 9th and 10th grade, adding a grade each year. The first graduating class was 1997, and the first graduating class with all four years of attendance was 1998. The magnet school focuses on computer and technology related study fields.

As of 2021, A-TECH is ranked #1 in the state of Nevada and #152 nationally by U.S. News & World Report.

Historical events
Unlike traditional high schools, A-TECH has no team sports. Students wishing to play team sports participate at their zoned high school.  Games of flag football and basketball had been held between A-TECH and Las Vegas Academy (another local magnet school with no sports teams) since the school's opening, though have been discontinued since 2008. Games of flag football and soccer are held annually between A-TECH and Northwest Career and Technical Academy, a magnet school that was opened in 2008.

The gymnasium building began construction during the 1998-1999 school year, and opened in 2000.

Efforts to increase the student population at the school began in the early 2000s.  Construction of the school's east wing (including additional classrooms, offices, and a lecture hall) and expansion of the existing cafeteria began in 2002, and were completed in time for the start of the 2003-2004 school year.  The expansion increased enrollment from approximately 750 students to just over 1000.

Students can study Architectural Design, Computer Science, Cybersecurity, Engineering, Graphic Design, Business, Information Technologies, and Legal Studies.  Starting in fall 2022, A-TECH will offer Biomedical as a program of study to replace Legal Studies.

Awards and recognition
During the 2003-04 school year, Advanced Technologies Academy was recognized with the Blue Ribbon School Award of Excellence by the United States Department of Education, the highest award an American school can receive.
A-TECH was named a School of Distinction—top Technology Excellence high school—by the Intel corporation in 2005.
Advanced Technologies Academy was recognized with the Exemplary School Award from the Nevada Department of Education for the graduating classes of 2002, 2003, 2005, and 2010, and received the High Achieving School Award from the Nevada Department of Education for the graduating classes of 2000, 2001, 2004, 2006, and 2007.
Magnet Schools of America recognized A-TECH as a School of Distinction in 2008.
U.S. News & World Report selected A-TECH as a Silver Medal Winner of America's Best High Schools in 2008.
A-TECH was recognized, for the second time, with the Blue Ribbon School Award of Excellence by the United States Department of Education on September 15, 2011.
A-TECH was recognized, for the third time, with the Blue Ribbon School Award of Excellence by the United States Department of Education on September 26, 2019.

Notable visitors
Since its opening in 1994, A-TECH has received several notable visitors. In 1996, Al Gore visited A-TECH to spotlight it as an example of how computer technology can enhance education.

After receiving the Blue Ribbon School award, Laura Bush visited the school in 2004 and had a round table discussion with many members of the staff and student body.

The school has also been visited by Louis Castle, cofounder of Westwood Studios.

In recognition to the school's recent nomination as one of the top five magnet schools in the United States, former Florida Governor Jeb Bush visited the school in 2014.

Former President Bill Clinton spoke at the school on January 21, 2016 to bolster support in Nevada for his wife, Hillary Clinton, who was angling for the Democratic presidential nomination.

Olympic gold medalist Connor Fields spoke at the school's public speaking class during the week of December 10, 2018 to December 14, 2018.

Notable faculty members
Notable A-TECH faculty have included:
Richard Knoeppel (Architectural Design) has received the following recognition:
Heart of Education award recipient, 2019
Named 2019 Nevada Teacher of the Year
Inducted into the National Teachers Hall of Fame in 2019
Mike Patterson (Mathematics), Milken Educator Award recipient in 2009
John Snyder (Computer Science) has received the following awards:
Milken Educator Award recipient in 1992
Dolly Parton presented him with the Chasing Rainbows Award in 2003.
Inducted into the National Teachers Hall of Fame in 2007
Valarie Young (World History), 2005 recipient of the Milken Educator Award

References

External links
Advanced Technologies Academy

Clark County School District
Magnet schools in Nevada
Educational institutions established in 1994
High schools in Las Vegas
School buildings completed in 1994
1994 establishments in Nevada
Public high schools in Nevada